Monique Miller,  (born 9 December 1933) is a French Canadian actress. She is known for her live theatre performances, and also performs in films and on television.

She is the sister of actress Louise Remy.

Career
In 1951 Miller performed in the first production of the Théâtre du Nouveau Monde in Montreal. She made her screen debut in the film Tit-Coq in 1953. In 1955 she performed in the television series  Cap-aux-sorciers. In 1965 she appeared in the mid-length docufiction film The Snow Has Melted on the Manicouagan (La neige a fondu sur la Manicouagan).

In 2001, she was made an Officer of the Order of Canada. In 2011, she was made a Grand Officer of the National Order of Quebec.

Miller performed in the play Absence at the Dublin Dance Festival in 2015. In 2016 she won the National Theatre School of Canada's Gascon Thomas award.

As of 2018 Miller continues to perform in Montreal.

References

External links
 
 Monique Miller at The Canadian Encyclopedia

1933 births
Living people
Actresses from Montreal
Canadian film actresses
Canadian television actresses
Canadian voice actresses
Grand Officers of the National Order of Quebec
Officers of the Order of Canada